Kaleidoscope is a 1987 novel by American Danielle Steel, published by Delacorte Press (see 1987 in literature). It was adapted into the NBC television movie of the same name in 1990 starring Jaclyn Smith and Perry King. It is Steel's 22nd novel.

Plot 

The story revolves around three sisters born to a French mother and an American GI father. The father kills the mother and then commits suicide. The story features the events of each girl's life.  Separated after the death of their parents, each one is raised quite differently. They are later reunited by an estranged family friend: the lawyer who placed them in the homes where they spent their childhoods. They later find out that he is part of the reason their father killed their mother.

1987 American novels
American novels adapted into films
American novels adapted into television shows
Novels by Danielle Steel
Delacorte Press books
American romance novels